Geoff Thomas (18 February 1948 – 13 January 2013) was a Welsh professional footballer who played for Swansea City, making 357 appearances in the Football League. He died on 13 January 2013.

In addition to his career with Swansea, he spent time a month on loan at Manchester United in December 1973.  After leaving Swansea in July 1976 he joined Milford United before playing local football in Swansea with North End in the Swansea Senior League.

He was capped by Wales at youth and under-23 level.

References

1948 births
2013 deaths
Welsh footballers
Wales under-23 international footballers
Swansea City A.F.C. players
English Football League players
Footballers from Swansea
Association football midfielders
Manchester United F.C. players
Milford United F.C. players
Wales youth international footballers